Hemiemblemaria simulus, the Wrasse blenny, is a species of chaenopsid blenny found in coral reefs in the western Atlantic ocean. It can reach a maximum length of  fish measurement. This species feeds primarily on small crustaceans and finfish. This species is also found in the aquarium trade.  It is the only known member of its genus.

References
 Longley, W. H.  and S. F. Hildebrand  1940 (14 Sept.) New genera and species of fishes from Tortugas, Florida. Papers Tortugas Laboratory, Carnegie Institution of Washington v. 32: 223–285, Pl. 1. Page 225.

wrasse blenny
Fish of the Caribbean
Monotypic fish genera
Taxa named by William Harding Longley
Taxa named by Samuel Frederick Hildebrand
wrasse blenny